The 2007 Nordic Figure Skating Championships was held from February 8th through 11th, 2007 at the Helsinki Ice Hall in Helsinki, Finland. The competition was open to elite figure skaters from Nordic countries. Skaters competed in two disciplines, men's singles and ladies' singles, across three levels: senior (Olympic-level), junior, and novice.

Senior results

Men

Ladies

Junior results

Men

Ladies

Novice results

Boys

Girls

External links
 2007 Nordics

Nordic Figure Skating Championships, 2007
Nordic Figure Skating Championships
International figure skating competitions hosted by Finland
Nordic Figure Skating Championships, 2007